Yoshikatsu is a masculine Japanese given name.

Possible writings
Yoshikatsu can be written using many different combinations of kanji characters. Here are some examples:

義克, "justice, overcome"
義勝, "justice, victory"
義活, "justice, alive"
吉克, "good luck, overcome"
吉勝, "good luck, victory"
吉活, "good luck, alive"
善克, "virtuous, overcome"
善勝, "virtuous, victory"
善活, "virtuous, alive"
芳克, "virtuous/fragrant, overcome"
芳勝, "virtuous/fragrant, victory"
芳活, "virtuous/fragrant, alive"
良克, "good, overcome"
良勝, "good, victory"
良活, "good, alive"
喜克, "rejoice, overcome"
慶克, "congratulate, overcome"

The name can also be written in hiragana よしかつ or katakana ヨシカツ.

Notable people with the name
, Japanese shōgun
, Japanese actor and voice actor
, Japanese footballer
, Japanese samurai
, Japanese politician
, Japanese daimyō
, Japanese sport wrestler

Japanese masculine given names